Tarnation is a 2017 Australian horror comedy film directed by Daniel Armstrong and starring Daisy Masterman.

Plot
When Oscar's dreams of becoming a rock star are destroyed after she's kicked out of her band and her boyfriend walks out on her, taking their cat, she goes out to a remote cabin in the woods near the ghost town of Tarnation to collect her thoughts. Unbeknownst to her, the satanic master of a demon unicorn seeks Oscar's blood to complete a ritual that will raise the devil from Hell. In order to stop Tarnation from falling upon the world, Oscar must battle a demonic force that can possess anyone in the woods and ultimately face the evil within her own soul.

Cast
Daisy Masterman as Oscar
Jasy Holt as Cameron
Sean McIntyre as the boss
Sarah Howett as the virgin sacrifice
Joshua Diaz as Bo
Emma-Louise Wilson as Wheels
Blake Waldron as Wilmer
Nichola Jayne as Dayna

References

External links
Tarnation at Internet Movie Database

2017 films
2017 horror films
2017 comedy horror films
Australian comedy horror films
2010s English-language films
2010s Australian films